= Benpyrine =

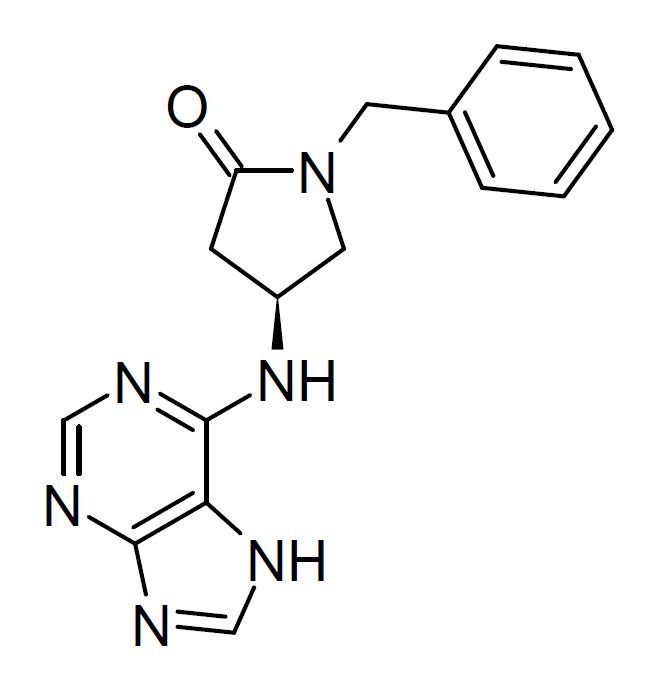

Identifiers
- IUPAC name: (4S)-1-benzyl-4-(7H-purin-6-ylamino)pyrrolidin-2-one
- CAS Number: 2550398-89-3
- PubChem CID: 95327594
- ChemSpider: 103790125
- ChEMBL: ChEMBL4649816

Chemical and physical data
- Formula: C_{16}H_{16}N_{6}O
- Molar mass: 308.345 g·mol^{−1}
- 3D model (JSmol): Interactive image
- SMILES: C1[C@@H](CN(C1=O)CC2=CC=CC=C2)NC3=NC=NC4=C3NC=N4
- InChI: InChI=1S/C16H16N6O/c23-13-6-12(8-22(13)7-11-4-2-1-3-5-11)21-16-14-15(18-9-17-14)19-10-20-16/h1-5,9-10,12H,6-8H2,(H2,17,18,19,20,21)/t12-/m0/s1; Key:HUWOMAVUXTXEKT-LBPRGKRZSA-N

Benpyrine is an experimental drug which binds to TNF-α and blocks TNF-α mediated signaling. It has antiinflammatory effects and is used in pharmacological research into various inflammatory processes mediated via TNF-α.

== See also ==
- Balinatunfib
- R-7050
