= R-7050 =

Experimental drug

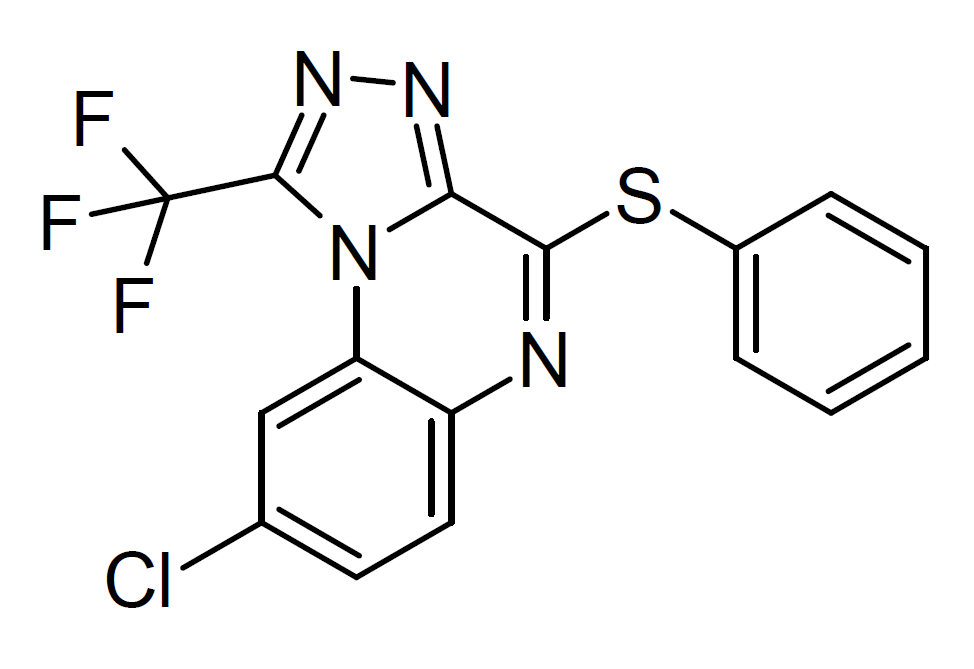

Identifiers
- IUPAC name: 8-chloro-4-phenylsulfanyl-1-(trifluoromethyl)-[1,2,4]triazolo[4,3-a]quinoxaline
- CAS Number: 303997-35-5
- PubChem CID: 1486608
- ChemSpider: 1227399
- ChEMBL: ChEMBL1440293

Chemical and physical data
- Formula: C_{16}H_{8}ClF_{3}N_{4}S
- Molar mass: 380.77 g·mol^{−1}
- 3D model (JSmol): Interactive image
- SMILES: C1=CC=C(C=C1)SC2=NC3=C(C=C(C=C3)Cl)N4C2=NN=C4C(F)(F)F
- InChI: InChI=1S/C16H8ClF3N4S/c17-9-6-7-11-12(8-9)24-13(22-23-15(24)16(18,19)20)14(21-11)25-10-4-2-1-3-5-10/h1-8H; Key:SUUMKHOVGVYGOP-UHFFFAOYSA-N

R-7050 is an experimental drug which acts as an antagonist for the receptors for TNF-α. It has antiinflammatory effects and is used in pharmacological research into various inflammatory processes mediated via TNF-α signalling.

== See also ==
- Balinatunfib
- Benpyrine
