= Balinatunfib =

Identifiers
- IUPAC name: (1R,11R)-5-[2-(1-aminocyclobutyl)pyrimidin-5-yl]-18-(difluoromethoxy)-12-methyl-2,9,12-triazapentacyclo[9.8.1.02,10.03,8.014,19]icosa-3(8),4,6,9,14(19),15,17-heptaen-13-one
- CAS Number: 2248726-53-4
- PubChem CID: 132042903
- IUPHAR/BPS: 13583
- ChemSpider: 129738176
- UNII: PLY98MAN4C
- KEGG: D13339

Chemical and physical data
- Formula: C_{27}H_{24}F_{2}N_{6}O_{2}
- Molar mass: 502.526 g·mol^{−1}
- 3D model (JSmol): Interactive image
- SMILES: CN1[C@@H]2C[C@H](C3=C(C1=O)C=CC=C3OC(F)F)N4C2=NC5=C4C=C(C=C5)C6=CN=C(N=C6)C7(CCC7)N
- InChI: InChI=1S/C27H24F2N6O2/c1-34-20-11-19(22-16(24(34)36)4-2-5-21(22)37-26(28)29)35-18-10-14(6-7-17(18)33-23(20)35)15-12-31-25(32-13-15)27(30)8-3-9-27/h2,4-7,10,12-13,19-20,26H,3,8-9,11,30H2,1H3/t19-,20-/m1/s1; Key:UROFXMLQPAUCGV-WOJBJXKFSA-N

Balinatunfib (SAR441566) is an experimental drug which acts as a potent small molecule inhibitor of TNF. Rather than blocking TNF receptors, balinatunfib inactivates TNF directly by stabilising an inactive form of the TNF trimer which fails to bind to its target receptors. It is in early stage clinical trials for rheumatoid arthritis and other chronic autoimmune diseases.

== See also ==
- R-7050
